Rank comparison chart of air forces of Asian states.

Officers

Warrant Officers

See also 
 Air force officer rank insignia

Notes

References

Asia
Air force ranks
Military comparisons